Qeshlaq-e Hajj Mahmud (also Romanized as Qeshlāq-e Ḩājj Maḩmūd) is a village in Qeshlaq-e Shomali Rural District, in the Central District of Parsabad County, Ardabil Province, Iran. At the 2006 census, its population was 58, in 10 families.

References 

Towns and villages in Parsabad County